is a Japanese writer of mystery and thriller. He is a member of the Honkaku Mystery Writers Club of Japan.

When he was at Hosei University, he was moved and influenced by honkaku (orthodox) mystery novels such as The Decagon House Murders, written by Yukito Ayatsuji, and Soji Shimada's works and he started writing.

He began his career as writer when he won the Yokomizo Seishi Mystery Prize, an annual Japanese literary prize for unpublished mystery novels, in 2002 for the novel Mizu no Tokei (Water Clock). One of the selection committee members of the year was Yukito Ayatsuji.

He is an avid fan of mystery novels of Seishi Yokomizo and Jeffrey Archer.

Awards and nominations
 2002 – Yokomizo Seishi Mystery Prize: Mizu no Tokei (Water Clock)
 2008 – Nominee for Mystery Writers of Japan Award for Best Short Story: "Taishutsu Gēmu" ("Exit Game") (The third short story of Haruchika series)
 2013 – Nominee for Mystery Writers of Japan Award for Best Novel or Linked Short Stories: Sennen Jurietto (One Thousand Years Juliet) (The fourth book of Haruchika series)

Bibliography

Haruchika series (Haruta & Chika series)

Each book includes four short stories.

, 2008 (Exit Game)
, 2009 (First Love Sommelier)
, 2010 (Fantasy Organ)
, 2012 (Thousand-year Juliet)
, 2015 (Planet Karon)

Standalone novels
 , 2002 (Water Clock)
 , 2004 (The Jet Black Prince)
 , 2008 (1/2 Knight)
 , 2009 (Twilight Museum)
 , 2011 (My Norma Jean)
 , 2012 (The Ulterior Amusement Park) aka. 
 , 2015 – based on the fictional manga series seen in Bakuman

See also

Japanese detective fiction

References

External links
 Profile at J'Lit Books from Japan

1973 births
21st-century Japanese novelists
Japanese male short story writers
Japanese mystery writers
Japanese crime fiction writers
Living people
Writers from Shizuoka Prefecture
21st-century Japanese short story writers
21st-century male writers